The BFW M.23, sometimes known as the Messerschmitt M 23, was a 1920s two-seat sporting aircraft designed by Willy Messerschmitt, and produced by Bayerische Flugzeugwerke (BFW). Examples won several prestigious races in 1929 and 1930.

Development
The BFW M.23, (the M standing for its designer Willy Messerschmitt), was developed in response to a specification issued in 1929 by the German Aero Club for the Ostpreussenflug (East Prussian Circuit) competition. The result was an improved version of the M.19, with seating for two, and wings that could be folded for transport or storage.

The M.23 was a small, conventional low-wing cantilever monoplane. It had a fixed undercarriage, the mainwheels mounted on a cranked axle, plus a tailskid. The fin and rudder assembly were broader and shorter than that of the M.19, though the shape varied with sub-type. A wide variety of engines were fitted, with power ranging from the 28 kW (38 hp) ABC Scorpion two-cylinder motor to the 112 kW (150 hp) of the seven-cylinder Siemens Sh 14a radial.

The first of three production variants, the M.23a used low-powered engines and had a very angular vertical tail. The M.23b had curved upper fuselage decking and a more rounded tail and was produced with a large range of engines, both inline and radial. The length depended slightly on the engine fitted. The final version, the M.23c had an enclosed cockpit, the most powerful engines and was slightly larger (200 mm/8 in in span, around 500 mm/20 in in length) than the earlier variants. Its tail was again different, more rounded at the top and missing the elevator cutaway of the earlier models.

At least one M.23b appeared on floats.

Operational history
The M.23bs won both the 1929 Ostpreussenflug (Genet-powered) and the Circuit of Europe (Siemens Sh 13-powered) races. The M.23c was developed for, and won, the Circuit of Europe the following year with seven of them entered.

Production numbers are not certain, but 74 appear on the reconstructed German civil aircraft register; 53 of these are M.23bs and 11 M.23cs. Many were bought by flying clubs for basic and acrobatic training. Other went to individual owners, with some familiar names amongst them like Ernst Udet (who made well publicised flights to Africa and to Greenland, the latter with Leni Riefenstahl as a passenger) and Rudolf Hess. In 1933, Erwin Aichele and his wife flew trouble-free for 13,000 km (8,000 mi) around the Mediterranean.

The corresponding Romanian registers show 26 more M.23bs, 14 of them locally built by ICAR (Intreprinderea de Constructii Aeronautice Romanesti, "Enterprise for Romanian Aeronautical Constructions") under licence from Messerschmitt. These were distinct from the Romanian modified version known as the ICAR Universal. The licensing deal was part of Messerschmitt's successful attempt to save a small core of staff from BFW when it went bankrupt in June 1931, a group that became Messerschmitt-Flugzeubau GmbH and survived until the reformation of BFW under the Nazis in 1933.

Variants
M.23initial open cockpit variant, powered by a  Daimler F7502 2-cyl horizontally-opposed engine.
M.23a either  ABC Scorpion or  Salmson 9ADb nine-cylinder radial.
M.23bmany engines fitted, including
 inline upright ADC Cirrus III
 inline ADC Cirrus Hermes
 five-cylinder radial Armstrong Siddeley Genet
 five-cylinder radial BMW X
 radial Siemens Sh 13
 seven-cylinder radial Siemens Sh 14
M.23cPowered by several engine types, including
 in-line inverted Argus As 8
 radial Siemens Sh 14a.

Specifications (M.23b with Siemens Sh 14 engine))

See also

Notes

Bibliography

External links

EADS: History of aviation > BFW M 23 (history, technical data and images)
The B.F.W. M.23. A German Light 'Plane with Many Variations, Flight, March 21, 1930

1920s German sport aircraft
M 23
Single-engined tractor aircraft
Low-wing aircraft
Aircraft first flown in 1928